Memphis Technical High School was a high school that served downtown Memphis, Tennessee from 1911 to 1987. The school building that exists today was constructed in 1927, and is operated by the Shelby County School System as the Northwest Preparatory Academy, serving children who are unable to function in a regular school environment.

History
The Memphis School Board of Education authorized the new Memphis Vocational High School in July 1911, and opened it September 1911, in the recently vacated Memphis High School building at 317 Poplar. The school was opened at the same time as the new Central High School, with the intention "to take the load off the new Central High, so that additional schools would not have to be built for some time".

Memphis Vocational High School was the first vocational high school in the US, opening with 72 students in grades 7 to 10, before classes began to grow. In 1917, J. L. Highsaw, a classroom teacher at the school, became principal. In 1918 the school name was changed to Crockett Vocational High School, with four teachers and 232 students. In 1921 the name was changed again to Crockett Technical High School.

Soon a new building was required, and it was decided that the nearby palatial Van Vleet mansion on Poplar Avenue would be demolished in favour of a modern school building. The school board paid $90,000 for the  property on which the home was located, and spent $500,000 to build the new school, built by the architectural firm of Hanker, Cairns, and Wallace. Until the new building opened, overflow classes were taught in the Jefferson Annex, the old Fowlkes School on Jefferson.

In 1928 the new building at 1266 Poplar was completed and the school changed its name for a final time to Memphis Technical High School. At the main entrance were four Corinthian columns, supporting a portico on the front. Some elements from the previous Van Vleet mansion were retained, including two stone lions at the east gate (since moved to the entrance of Memphis Zoo and then to a central location within the zoo), a stone bench from the mansion's green house, and two large classic urns at the top of the entrance steps. The four columns and portico of the school's entrance themselves reflect the entrance to the Van Vleet mansion. 

In 1936, Tech had 47 teachers and over 1400 students. Highsaw retired in 1957 and W. A. Bourne became principal, until 1975. The school continued to grow until the "decline of the cities" in the 1970s. With the changing demographics of the inner-city, it finally closed in 1987.

Notable alumni

James Autry - 1951. Editor Better Homes and Gardens - author of 10 books
Aubrey Epps - 1933 - Major League Baseball player
Gene Bearden - Major League Pitcher
Bobby Bragan - 1936. Major League Baseball player
Ace Cannon - 1952. Musician. "Godfather of Sax"
Burton Callicott - 1926. Artist - Teacher. Painted murals at the Pink Palace
Charlie Musselwhite - 1962. Musician "Chicago Harp style"
Don Nix - Songwriter, Record Producer, Creator of the "Memphis Sound"
Curtis Person - 1933. Golfer
Kay Starr - 1940. Singer
Travis Wammack - Musician - "fastest guitar player in the South"
William Walton - Co-founder of Holiday Inns

References

 Memphis Commercial Appeal, September 4, 1911

External links
Memoriam Listings
Memphis Tech High Alumni website
Tech High Class of 1950
Tech High Class of 1951
 Tech High Class of 1957
The Tech Ledger

Educational institutions established in 1878
Educational institutions disestablished in 1987
Schools in Memphis, Tennessee
Defunct schools in Tennessee
1878 establishments in Tennessee
1987 disestablishments in Tennessee